Steven C. Segaloff (born July 21, 1970 in New Haven, Connecticut) is an American rowing cox. He finished 5th in the men's eight at the 1996 Summer Olympics.

Life and career

Steven Segaloff attended Cornell University, where he was active on the university's rowing team. He later attended the University of Chicago Law School where he graduated in 2000 with a J.D. He was an associate at Cravath, Swaine & Moore from 2000 to 2004, and later became Vice President and General Counsel of National Financial Partners. From 2006 to 2013, Segaloff was Deputy General Counsel at Plainfield Asset Management and from 2013 to 2017 General Counsel at Genesys Global. In November 2017, Segaloff founded his own company Bellnote Partners LLC together with co-founder Carl Sheldon.

Steven Segaloff was the cox in the United States men's eight, which became world champion in 1994 and won bronze medals in 1993 and 1995. Segaloff won gold at the Pan-American Games in 1995 with the men's eight and with the men's four. He participated in the 1996 Atlanta Olympics, where his boat finished fifth.

References 
 
 

1970 births
Living people
American male rowers
Sportspeople from New Haven, Connecticut
Rowers at the 1996 Summer Olympics
Coxswains (rowing)
Olympic rowers of the United States
World Rowing Championships medalists for the United States
Pan American Games medalists in rowing
Pan American Games gold medalists for the United States
Rowers at the 1995 Pan American Games